is a 1974 film based on a story by Sakyo Komatsu.
The film was directed by Jun Fukuda from a screenplay by Ei Ogawa.  It stars Hiroshi Fujioka, Masao Kusakari, Kaoru Yumi, Tomisaburo Wakayama and Eiji Okada.

Plot
The International Psychic Power Group is a covert organization financed by the United Nations. Made up of clairvoyant supermen under the guise of the International Pollution Research Center, they wage a private war against enemies that threaten world peace and the total annihilation of the human race. With hostility between the East and West reaching a boiling point, four Eastern European delegates are assassinated aboard the Milan-Geneva International Express on their way to the United Nations for the Mediation Committee of International Dispute. The Baltonian Prime Minister is the next to be targeted for termination. A ruthless psychic assassin named Goro hunts down the psychokinetic saviors, themselves marked for death by an anti-ESPY group led by the insidious and superhuman Ulrov, who plans to destroy mankind by initiating World War III.

Cast
Hiroshi Fujioka as Yoshio Tamura
Kaoru Yumi as Maria Harada
Masao Kusakari as Jiro Miki
Yuzo Kayama as Hojo
Tomisaburo Wakayama as Ulrov
 Luna Takamura as Julietta
 Hatsuo Yamaya as Ball
 Jimmy Shaw as Godonov
 Willie Dorsey as Abdullah
Katsumasa Uchida as Gorou Tatsumi
Steve Green as the Prime Minister of Baltonia
Andrew Hughes as P.B.
Eiji Okada as Salabad
Gorō Mutsumi as Teraoka
 Ralph Jesser as Anti-ESPY A
 Germal Liner as Anti-ESPY B
 Franz Gruber as Anti-ESPY C
 Bart Johanson as Anti-ESPY D
 Robert Dunham as Airline captain

Release
ESPY was released theatrically in Japan on 28 December 1974, where it was distributed by Toho. It was released in the United States by Toho International with English subtitles and a 94-minute running time in 1975. It was released to home video with the on-screen title E.S.P./SPY with a 1984 English-language dub for television syndication by UPA of America and with an 86-minute running time by Paramount/Gateway in 1994.

References

Footnotes

Sources

External links
 

1974 films
Toho tokusatsu films
Films directed by Jun Fukuda
1970s science fiction films
UPA films
Films produced by Tomoyuki Tanaka
1970s spy films
Films set in Switzerland
1970s Japanese films
Japanese spy films